Papilio macilentus, the long tail spangle, is a butterfly of the family Papilionidae. The species was first described by Oliver Erichson Janson in 1877.

Description
Wings are black, with red spots, wavy edges and long tails on its hindwings. At the outer edge of the hindwings there is row of small red spots, while at the inner edge there is a red eyespot. This species has one of the longest and nicely-shaped tails in the family Papilionidae. Males have a yellow transversal band in the overlapping part between the forewings and the hindwings. The underside of the forewings is dark brown, with black veins. The thorax, the head and the abdomen are black.

The spring type is found from April to June, and the summer type from July to August. During daytime, females fly low and lay eggs one by one on the leaves of the plants. The larvae feed on Rutaceae species (Orixa japonica, Poncirus trifoliata, Ruta graveolens, Zanthoxylum ailanthoides, Zanthoxylum piperitum, Zanthoxylum schinifolium). The spring brood hibernates in the pupal stage. Pupae have two types of colors - green and gray brown.

Distribution and habitat
This species can be found in Japan, China and Korea. It lives in the valleys or the margins of the forest.

References

 GloBIS (GART): Global Butterfly Information System. Häuser C., Holstein J. & Steiner A. (eds).

External links
 "Papilio macilentus Janson, 1877". Catalogue of Life.
 "Papilio macilentus Janson, 1877". Insecta.pro.

macilentus
Butterflies of Japan
Insects of Korea
Taxa named by Oliver Erichson Janson
Butterflies described in 1877